Desert Mirage High School is a public high school for grades 9–12. It is located in Thermal, California. The school is part of the Coachella Valley Unified School District.

References

External links
 Desert Mirage High School - Web Site

Educational institutions established in 2003
High schools in Riverside County, California
Public high schools in California
2003 establishments in California